The 338th Bombardment Group is a disbanded United States Air Force unit. It was last active with Continental Air Command at O'Hare International Airport, Illinois on 27 June 1949.  It was first activated during World War II as the 338th Fighter Group and served primarily as a training unit until it was disbanded in 1944.  The group was reconstituted in the reserves in 1947, but was inactivated when military spending was reduced in 1949.

History

World War II
The group was activated as part of III Fighter Command at Dale Mabry Field, Florida in July 1942. The 305th, 306th, and 312th Fighter Squadrons were assigned as its operational elements. The group initially flew a mix of Bell P-39 Airacobras, Curtiss P-40 Warhawks, Republic P-47 Thunderbolts and North American P-51 Mustangs.

The group's mission was to act as a Replacement Training Unit (RTU).  RTUs were oversized units that trained individual pilots or aircrews following their graduation from flight school. In February 1943, the group added a fourth squadron, the 441st Fighter Squadron. After this squadron was operational, the group began a split operation, with group headquarters and the 305th and 306th Squadrons remaining at Dale Mabry Field, while the 312th and 441st Squadrons operated from Perry Army Air Field, Florida. After September 1943, the group focused on P-47 training, although it also had some P-40s again in 1944.

However, the Army Air Forces was finding that standard military units, based on relatively inflexible tables of organization were not proving well adapted to the training mission.  Accordingly it adopted a more functional system for its training bases in which each base was organized into a separate numbered unit.
The group and its squadrons were disbanded in May 1944, and its personnel, equipment and mission at Dale Mabry Field transferred to 335th Army Air Force Base Unit (Replacement Training Unit, Fighter), while units at Perry were blended into the 342d AAF Base Unit (Replacement Training Unit, Fighter).

Air reserves
The group was reconstituted in 1947 and activated in the reserves at Orchard Place Airport, Illinois on 12 June.  It was assigned the 561st 562d and 563d Bombardment Squadrons. The 560th Bombardment Squadron, which was already active at Orchard Park, however, was not assigned to the group until the end of September. In October, the 42d Fighter Squadron was activated and assigned to the group. The group trained under the supervision of Air Defense Command (ADC)'s 141st AAF Base Unit (Reserve Training) (later the 2471st Air Force Reserve Flying Training Center), although it does not appear that it was fully manned or equipped.

In July 1948 Continental Air Command (ConAC) assumed responsibility for managing reserve and Air National Guard units from ADC. In September 1948, the group's 561st Squadron moved to General Mitchell Field, Wisconsin, although it remained assigned to the group. The 338th was inactivated when ConAC reorganized its reserve units under the wing base organization system in June 1949.  President Truman’s reduced 1949 defense budget also required reductions in the number of units in the Air Force, At O'Hare, the 338th Group and its squadrons were inactivated, and most of its personnel transferred to the 437th Troop Carrier Wing. The 561st Squadron in Wisconsin was also inactivated, but its inactivation temporarily ended reserve flying operations there.

Lineage
 Constituted as the 338th Fighter Group on 16 July 1942
 Activated on 22 July 1942
 Disbanded on 4 May 1944
 Reconstituted and redesignated 338th Bombardment Group, Very Heavy, on 5 May 1947
 Activated on 12 June 1947
 Inactivated on 27 June 1949
 Disbanded 9 September 1992

Assignments
 III Fighter Command, 22 July 1942 – 4 May 1944
 73d Bombardment Wing (later 73d Air Division), 12 June 1947 – 27 June 1949

Components
 42d Fighter Squadron: 15 October 1947 – 27 June 1949
 305th Fighter Squadron: 16 July 1942 – 1 May 1944
 306th Fighter Squadron: 16 July 1942 – 1 May 1944
 312th Fighter Squadron: 16 July 1942 – 1 May 1944
 441st Fighter Squadron: 21 February 1943 – 1 May 1944
 560th Bombardment Squadron: 30 September 1947 – 27 June 1949
 561st Bombardment Squadron: 12 June 1947 – 27 June 1949
 562d Bombardment Squadron: 12 June 1947 – 27 June 1949
 563d Bombardment Squadron: 12 June 1947 – 27 June 1949

Stations
 Dale Mabry Field, Florida, 22 July 1942 – 1 May 1944
 Orchard Place Airport (later O'Hare International Airport), Illinois, 12 June 1947 – 27 June 1949

Aircraft
 Bell P-39 Airacobra, 1942–1944
 Curtiss P-40 Warhawk, 1942–1943, 1944
 Republic P-47 Thunderbolt, 1942–1944
 North American P-51 Mustang, 1942–1943

Campaigns

See also

 List of United States Air Force Groups

References

Notes

Bibliography

 
 
 
 
 
 
 

Bombardment groups of the United States Army Air Forces
Bombardment groups of the United States Air Force
Military units and formations established in 1947
Military units and formations disestablished in 1992